Mathiang is a  boma in  Baidit payam, Bor West County, Jonglei State, South Sudan, about 30 kilometers north of Bor.  The village is located at the southern extent of the sudd, South Sudan's central wetlands, on the east side of the  Bahr al Jabal River.

Demographics
According to the Fifth Population and Housing Census of Sudan, conducted in April 2008, Mathiang  boma had a population of 8,949 people, composed of 4,469 male and 4,480 female residents.

Notes

References 

Populated places in Jonglei State